Tantallon (pronounced 'tan-TAL-en') is an exurban community in Halifax Regional Municipality, Nova Scotia, Canada. It extends from about two kilometers south of Trunk 3, along Route 333, just north of Ballfield Road, for roughly three kilometers along Route 333, to just south of Longards road, and includes Whynachts Point and Sheeps Head Island. It is bordered to the north by Upper Tantallon and to the south by Glen Haven.

The community is likely named for Tantallon Castle in Scotland.

2008 fire
On June 13, 2008, a forest fire broke out causing minor damage to two homes and burning . The fire was believed to have been caused by a campfire. The Royal Canadian Mounted Police laid no charges. It was determined that remnant fallen debris of Hurricane Juan fueled the fire.

References 

Explore HRM
Wildfires of 2008

Communities in Halifax, Nova Scotia